Marie Bryant (November 6, 1919 – May 23, 1978) was an American dancer, singer and choreographer, described as "one of the most vivacious black dancers in the United States".

Biography
Bryant was born in Meridian, Mississippi, moving with her family as a child to New Orleans, Louisiana.  By the age of 10, she was performing impersonations of Josephine Baker at her church. In her teens, her dance teacher, Mary Bruce, included her in her annual show at the Regal Theater in Chicago. She made her professional debut with Louis Armstrong at the Grand Terrace Cafe in Chicago in 1934, and became a regular singer and dancer in the venue's floor shows. She then performed in Los Angeles with Lionel Hampton, and at the Cotton Club in New York City with Duke Ellington.

By 1939, she was a featured attraction at the Apollo Theater in Harlem, and toured nationally with Duke Ellington.  In Los Angeles, she performed in Ellington's 1941 musical revue Jump For Joy, featuring the hit number "Bli-Blip". She also appeared as the head of a dance troupe in the movie Carolina Blues (1944), and sang in the short film Jammin' the Blues (also 1944), accompanied by Lester Young, Barney Kessel and others.  In 1946, she starred in the musical show Beggar's Holiday, with music by Ellington and lyrics by John LaTouche.

She worked as a teacher at the dance schools run by Katherine Dunham and Eugene Loring, where she taught actors, including Marlon Brando.  In 1948 in Los Angeles she was a headline act at the Florentine Gardens (which rebranded itself The Cotton Club), where she taught burlesque and other routines to dancers in the chorus line.  She appeared in the RKO movie They Live by Night (1948), as well as Betty Grable's 20th Century Fox film Wabash Avenue (1950), and toured the US in The Big Show of 1951 with Ethel Waters, Sarah Vaughan and Nat 'King' Cole.  She continued to teach dance to film actors, working with Gene Kelly – who called her "one of the finest dancers I've ever seen in my life" – Debbie Reynolds, Cyd Charisse, Betty Grable, Ava Gardner and others.  She worked as a dance coach and choreographer for Paramount, 20th Century Fox, MGM and Columbia, and developed her own dance teaching style which she called "controlled release".

Bryant continued to appear in musical shows into the early 1950s. In 1952, she toured with the Harlem Blackbirds, and married the company manager John A. Rajakumar. The following year she appeared in London in the musical High Spirits, and performed around Europe, and in Australia and New Zealand.  While in London in 1953, she performed a satirical anti-apartheid calypso song, "The Plea", with a refrain of "Don't malign Malan because he dislikes our tan", which created controversy at the time of South African Prime Minister D. F. Malan's visit to Britain to attend the Coronation of Queen Elizabeth II.  She returned to the US after Rajakumar became ill; he died in 1965.

In the 1970s, she ran the Marie Bryant Dance Studios, and was an understudy to Pearl Bailey in the stage show Hello, Dolly!.  Bryant continued to work as a choreographer in Los Angeles and Las Vegas.

She died of cancer in Los Angeles in 1978, at the age of 58.

Partial filmography
 The Duke Is Tops (1938)
Jammin' the Blues (1944)
They Live by Night (1948)
Tiger by the Tail (1955)
 When Strangers Marry (1944; uncredited)

References

External links

1919 births
1978 deaths
African-American choreographers
American choreographers
African-American female dancers
American female dancers
African-American dancers
Musicians from Meridian, Mississippi
Singers from Mississippi
Musicians from New Orleans
Deaths from cancer in California
20th-century American singers
Singers from Louisiana
20th-century American women singers
20th-century American dancers
20th-century African-American women singers